Point of Impact, also released as Spanish Rose, is a 1993 action film directed by Bob Misiorowski starring Michael Paré, Barbara Carrera and Michael Ironside. Paré plays a customs officer turned vigilante, and Carrera the wife of a Cuban mob boss, played by Ironside. Some scenes were filmed in KwaZulu-Natal in South Africa, in Durban and Umhlanga Rocks.

References

External links 
 
 
 

1993 films
American action films
1990s American films